The Teacher's Charter is the legal document that defines the rights and duties of school teachers (distinguished from academic teachers) in Poland. It was adopted on January 26, 1982, and has been amended several times since then.

The Teacher's Charter governs all job positions in public schools below university level (primary, junior high and upper secondary education) that require pedagogical qualifications.  

The Charter regulates the working conditions, qualification requirements, duties, disciplinary responsibilities, and principles of professional advancement of teachers; as well as the awards, social benefits, holidays, pensions and health care available to them. 

The Charter has been criticized.

References

Education in Poland
Law of Poland